is a Japanese freestyle skier, specializing in  moguls.

Tsukita competed at the 1998, 2002, 2006 and 2010 Winter Olympics for Japan. His best performance came in 2002, when he qualified for the moguls final, finishing 16th. He also advanced to the final in 2010, finishing 17th. In 1998, he finished 18th in the qualifying round, and did not advance. In 2006, he finished 33rd in the qualifying round, and did not advance.

As of February 2013, he has won one medal at the World Championships, a silver in the 2003 dual moguls event.

Tsukita made his World Cup debut in January 1995. As of February 2013, he has won one World Cup event, a Dual Moguls competition at Madarao in 1999/00. Altogether, he has eleven World Cup medals, his first coming at Blackcomb in 1996/97. His best World Cup finish is 10th, in 2008/09.

World Cup Podiums

References

1976 births
Living people
Japanese male freestyle skiers
Olympic freestyle skiers of Japan
Freestyle skiers at the 1998 Winter Olympics
Freestyle skiers at the 2002 Winter Olympics
Freestyle skiers at the 2006 Winter Olympics
Freestyle skiers at the 2010 Winter Olympics
Freestyle skiers at the 2003 Asian Winter Games
Freestyle skiers at the 2011 Asian Winter Games
Asian Games medalists in freestyle skiing
Asian Games bronze medalists for Japan
Medalists at the 2011 Asian Winter Games
Sportspeople from Hokkaido
People from Hokkaido